In mathematics, the ping-pong lemma, or table-tennis lemma, is any of several mathematical statements that ensure that several elements in a group acting on a set freely generates a free subgroup of that group.

History

The ping-pong argument goes back to the late 19th century and is commonly attributed to Felix Klein who used it to study subgroups of Kleinian groups, that is, of discrete groups of isometries of the hyperbolic 3-space or, equivalently Möbius transformations of the Riemann sphere. The ping-pong lemma was a key tool used by Jacques Tits in his 1972 paper containing the proof of a famous result now known as the Tits alternative. The result states that a finitely generated linear group is either virtually solvable or contains a free subgroup of rank two. The ping-pong lemma and its variations are widely used in geometric topology and geometric group theory.

Modern versions of the ping-pong lemma can be found in many books such as Lyndon & Schupp, de la Harpe, Bridson & Haefliger and others.

Formal statements

Ping-pong lemma for several subgroups

This version of the ping-pong lemma ensures that several subgroups of a group acting on a set generate a free product. The following statement appears in Olijnyk and Suchchansky (2004), and the proof is from de la Harpe (2000).

Let G be a group acting on a set X and let H1, H2, ..., Hk be subgroups of G where k ≥ 2, such that at least one of these subgroups has order greater than 2.
Suppose there exist pairwise disjoint nonempty subsets  of  such that the following holds:

Then

Proof
We then let  act on an element of one of the sets . As we assume that at least one subgroup  has order at least 3, without loss of generality we may assume that  has order at least 3. We get the following chain of containments:

To finish the proof we must consider the three cases: 

if , then let  (such an  exists since by assumption  has order at least 3);
if , then let ;
and if , then let .

This proves the claim.

The Ping-pong lemma for cyclic subgroups

Let G be a group acting on a set X. Let a1, ...,ak be elements of G of infinite order, where k ≥ 2. Suppose there exist disjoint nonempty subsets

Then the subgroup  generated by a1, ..., ak is free with free basis .

Proof
This statement follows as a corollary of the version for general subgroups if we let  and let .

Examples

Special linear group example
One can use the ping-pong lemma to prove that the subgroup , generated by the matrices
 and 
is free of rank two.

Proof

and

Put

and

It is not hard to check, using the above explicit descriptions of H1 and H2, that for every nontrivial  we have  and that for every nontrivial  we have . Using the alternative form of the ping-pong lemma, for two subgroups, given above, we conclude that .

Word-hyperbolic group example

Let  be a word-hyperbolic group which is torsion-free, that is, with no nonidentity elements of finite order. Let  be two non-commuting elements, that is such that . Then there exists M ≥ 1 such that for any integers ,  the subgroup  is free of rank two.

Sketch of the proof
The group G acts on its hyperbolic boundary ∂G by homeomorphisms.

Then the attracting/repelling properties of the fixed points of g and h imply that there exists  such that for any integers ,  we have:

The ping-pong lemma now implies that  is free of rank two.

Applications of the ping-pong lemma

The ping-pong lemma is used in Kleinian groups to study their so-called Schottky subgroups.  In the Kleinian groups context the ping-pong lemma can be used to show that a particular group of isometries of the hyperbolic 3-space is not just free but also properly discontinuous and geometrically finite.
Similar Schottky-type arguments are widely used in geometric group theory, particularly for subgroups of word-hyperbolic groups and for automorphism groups of trees.
The ping-pong lemma is also used for studying Schottky-type subgroups of mapping class groups of Riemann surfaces, where the set on which the mapping class group acts is the Thurston boundary of the Teichmüller space. A similar argument is also utilized in the study of subgroups of the outer automorphism group of a free group.
One of the most famous applications of the ping-pong lemma is in the proof of Jacques Tits of the so-called Tits alternative for linear groups. (see also  for an overview of Tits' proof and an explanation of the ideas involved, including the use of the ping-pong lemma).
There are generalizations of the ping-pong lemma that produce not just free products but also amalgamated free products and HNN extensions. These generalizations are used, in particular, in the proof of Maskit's Combination Theorem for Kleinian groups.
There are also versions of the ping-pong lemma which guarantee that several elements in a group generate a free semigroup. Such versions are available both in the general context of a group action on a set,  and for specific types of actions, e.g. in the context of linear groups, groups acting on trees and others.

References

See also
Free group
Free product
Kleinian group
Tits alternative
Word-hyperbolic group
Schottky group

Lemmas in group theory
Discrete groups
Lie groups
Combinatorics on words